Dickmann is a German surname. Notable people with the surname include:

Arend Dickmann (1572–1627), Polish Navy admiral
Bernard F. Dickmann (1888–1971), American politician
Friedrich Dickmann, German politician
Lorenzo Dickmann (born 1996), Italian footballer

See also
Ernst Dickmanns, German computer scientist
Dickman

German-language surnames